Luckdown Be Positive is a 2022 Indian Marathi-language Family Comedy drama film directed by Santosh Ramdas Manjrekar and produced by Ishnav Media House. Luckdown was released on 25 February 2022.

Plot 
During a country-wide lockdown, an over-enthusiastic couple venture to make their wedding preparations in proper order as they strive to get married virtually.

Cast 

 Ankush Chaudhari 
 Prajakta Mali 
 Priya Arun 
 Shubha Khote 
 Sameer Khandekar
 Anand Ingale 
 Sanjay Khapre 
 Sunil Godbole 
 Abhilasha Patil 
 Sanjay Mone 
 Vanita Kharat 
 Yogita Chavan 
 Millind Safai 
 Sneha Raikar 
 Onkar Raut 
 Ishan Phulpagar 
 Mughdha Dhotre

References

External links 

 

2022 films
2020s Marathi-language films